Hirotaka Nozuki (野月 浩貴 Nozuki [Nodzuki] Hirotaka, born July 4, 1973) is a Japanese professional shogi player, ranked 8-dan.

Early life
Hirotaka Nozuki was born in Kita-ku, Sapporo on July 4, 1973. He won the 10th  tournament in 1985, and the same year entered the Japan Shogi Association's apprentice school at the rank of 6-kyū as a student of shogi professional . He was promoted to the rank of 1-dan in 1991 and obtained full professional status and the rank of 4-dan in October 1996.

Promotion history
The promotion history for Nozuki is as follows:
 6-kyū: 1985
 1-dan: 1991
 4-dan: October 1, 1996
 5-dan: October 10, 2000
 6-dan: April 1, 2004
 7-dan: April 1, 2005
 8-dan: January 20, 2017

Titles and other championships
Nozuki has never appeared in a major title match, but he has won two non-major shogi championships during his career: the 17th  (1998) and the 19th  (199899).

References

External links
ShogiHub: Professional Player Info · Nozuki, Hirotaka

1973 births
Japanese shogi players
Living people
Professional shogi players
Professional shogi players from Hokkaido
People from Sapporo